Raw TV is a British television production company based in London producing documentaries and scripted television shows, including Gold Rush, Banged Up Abroad, Shackleton: Death or Glory, Three Identical Strangers, Stanley Tucci: Searching for Italy and The Tinder Swindler. The company was founded in 2001 by Dimitri Doganis, with a "small development deal" from Channel 4. The company was acquired by Discovery Communications in 2014, and then by All3Media in 2017.

References 

British companies established in 2001
Television production companies of the United Kingdom
All3Media
Mass media companies based in London
Mass media companies established in 2001
2014 mergers and acquisitions
2017 mergers and acquisitions